Hasanabad-e Kamin (also Romanized as Ḩasanābād-e Kamīn; also known as Ḩasanābād) is a village in Kamin Rural District, in the Central District of Pasargad County, Fars Province, Iran. At the 2006 census, its population was 236, in 46 families.

References 

Populated places in Pasargad County